Jean Poldo d’Albenas (1512–1563) was the King's Counsel in Nîmes (France), and contributed to the spread of Calvinism in his home town of Nîmes. He produced, among other works, a Discours historial de l’antique et illustre cité de Nismes (1557) in French, which his contemporaries apparently found difficult to read; it is considered to contain useful research material for historians. He was also a lawyer at the Parliament of Toulouse.

Bibliography

References 

1512 births
1563 deaths
People from Nîmes
16th-century French writers
16th-century male writers
French politicians
French Calvinist and Reformed Christians

fr:Jean Poldo d'Albenas